Thomas O'Reilly (ca. 1839 – February 21, 1897) was a trader and political figure in Newfoundland. He represented Placentia and St. Mary's in the Newfoundland and Labrador House of Assembly from 1865 to 1869 as a Conservative.

Born in Placentia, O'Reilly was defeated when he ran for reelection in 1869. He served as a magistrate from 1877 until his death in Placentia in 1897.

He founded the local Star of the Sea Society in 1876 and was its President until his death.

A baptism exists in the Freshwater Parish Records for a Thomas of John Reily and Hana Bonia in 1837. This is thought to be his baptism. He was a member of the prominent O'Reilly family of Placentia and the uncle of Archbishop Edward Patrick Roche of St. John's, Newfoundland.

His son, William O'Reilly was also a magistrate from 1897-1923, and constructed the O'Reilly House museum in which he lived in during his tenure. The museum is a top tourist destination in the Placentia area for anyone looking for history about the area.

References 
 

Members of the Newfoundland and Labrador House of Assembly
1897 deaths
Year of birth uncertain
Newfoundland Colony judges